MC Fioti is a Brazilian funk carioca rapper and producer. He was born on 30 August 1994 in Itapecerica da Serra, São Paulo.

Biography
He rose to popularity in 2016 thanks to his social media-savvy hit single "Vai Toma" which he recorded with fellow São Paulo native MC Pikachu. Characterized by lean, bright productions with heavy bass, Fioti unleashed a deluge of tracks over the next year with a variety of different collaborators like MC Lan and hip-hop duo, Tribo da Periferia. A remix of his catchy 2017 track "Bum Bum Tam Tam" caught fire when it became a five-way collaboration with Future, J Balvin, Stefflon Don, and Juan Magán becoming his biggest single to date. The original song has received over 1.5 billion views on YouTube.

In January 2021, he released the video for "Bum bum tam tam (remix vaccine Butantan)", recorded at the headquarters of the Butantan Institute, with the participation of employees of the institution, in honor of the work of the research center in the development of the CoronaVac vaccine in partnership with the biopharmaceutical company Sinovac Biotech.

Discography
 #Vemverão (Warner Music)
 Sentou k ladinha (Warner Music)
 Band Life (Warner Music)
 Nois é Thug Life (Warner Music)
 Bum Bum Tam Tam 
 Lá vai xerecão (Warner Music)
 De Quebradinha (Warner Music)
 Maloqueiro (Warner Music)
 Desce de perna aberta (Warner Music)
 Quadradinho (Warner Music)
 Engatilha e Bum (Warner Music)
 Taikondo (Warner Music)
 Bum Bum Tam Tam (Remix) (Aftercluv Dance Lab / Island / Universal)
 Vida de casado (Warner Music)
 Bum Bum Tam Tam (Remix) (Aftercluv Dance Lab / Island / Universal)

Singles

See also 

 MC Pipokinha

References

1994 births
Living people
Funk carioca musicians
21st-century Brazilian male singers
21st-century Brazilian singers